The following is a list of Michigan State Historic Sites in Sanilac County, Michigan. Sites marked with a dagger (†) are also listed on the National Register of Historic Places in Sanilac County, Michigan.


Current listings

See also
 National Register of Historic Places listings in Sanilac County, Michigan

Sources
 Historic Sites Online – Sanilac County. Michigan State Housing Developmental Authority. Accessed June 3, 2011.

References

Sanilac County
State Historic Sites